is a castle structure in Kusu, Ōita Prefecture, Japan.

Current
There are little remains of the castle on the present day site, some stone walls and moats. In 2017, the castle was listed as one of the Continued Top 100 Japanese Castles.

Literature

References

Castles in Ōita Prefecture
Historic Sites of Japan
Former castles in Japan
Ruined castles in Japan